Essenbæk Church (Essenbæk Kirke) in Assentoft is the parish church in Essenbæk Parish in Randers Southern Provostship in the Diocese of Aarhus.

Old Essenbæk Church 

An earlier church was built on a hill in the hundred Haldherred probably in the 12th century, and is known from the 13th century as Essenbæk (Eskingbec) - a name which perhaps refers to the present Volkmølle Creek (Volkmølle Bæk). The first particle esking supposedly means an inhabitant of Assentoft, but the creek seems later to have been named after a fulling mill (valkemølle), which in time, however, was used as gristmill.
The church was first built in Romanesque style as a nave and probably a chancel – internally consisting of granite boulders built around raw fieldstone, and externally of granite ashlars. On the northern and southern side of the church were a simple rectangular entrance, and the ceiling of the church was flat and plastery. Later the chancel was torn down, after which the eastern end of the nave, demarcated by an ogival chancel arch, was used as such, and the northern entrance was walled up. Probably also later a small round arched window was established on the northern side, and a steeple resting on five pillars built into the nave and with pyramid roof of lead was added above the southwestern corner of the church. A church porch at the southern entrance and a groin vault seem added in the 15th century. Then the church was internally 31¾ alen (19.93 meters) long og 12¼ alen (7.69 meters) wide. The church stood in the northwestern corner of a ca. 65 meters long og 65 meters wide churchyard fenced in by a 1.5 meter high boulder dike, southwesterly in which was a driving gate and a walking gate in a whitewashed portal in late Medieval style of large medieval brick. Already September 4, 1424 the church was called Old Essenbæk (Gamel Essenbæk; Gammel Essenbæk), and was then owned by Essenbæk Abbey, which together with its estate was confiscated by the king in 1540. When the abbey was later torn down, its bell was taken to the church.
Christen Skel Jørgensen bought September 7, 1678 ”the church’s share of the tithe of the mentioned parishes, the appurtenant easement over the parsonages and the smallholdings of the parish clerks and all of the churches’ adjoining land estate and other appurtenant easement and the right of presentation” (Kirkens Andel af Tienden af de nævnte Sogne, Herligheden over Præstegaardene og Degnebolene og alt Kirkernes tilliggende Jordegods og anden Herlighed samt Kaldsretten) including e.g. Essenbæk Parish. With this so-called right of patronage he was in reality the owner of the church, though with the responsibility for its condition.

When the art historian N. L. Høyen in 1830 visited Essenbæk Church, he drew e.g. its baptismal font. However, when in the summer of 1865 the architect Johannes Frederik (Frits) Christian Uldall visited the church, there stood another baptismal font – this one in Baroque style of wood, and representing a kneeling figure bearing a basin.

In the autumn of 1865 the then decrepit church was torn down, but the churchyard was preserved, and was used some years still. Some of the church’s furniture, including 10 of the triptych’s figurines representing the 12 Apostles, were sold at auction, but the figurines representing the apostles James the Just and Peter were taken by the mason N. Schunck, who participated at the demolition. In 1894 he gave them to Randers Museum, and two years later Countess Christiane Scheel gave the triptych’s figurines representing Christ and Mary to the museum. In 1910 a monument was erected on the churchyard, and in 1971 wooden gates were added to the then tile-hung portal in the churchyard dike. Around the monument, the corners of the church are indicated now by edge-raised natural stones.

Building history 

The ”church owner” wanted to build a new church in Assentoft, but the local parish superintendency would that a new church like the old one should stand outside the village. The Ministry for Ecclesiastical Affairs and Public Instruction, which mediated communication between the two parties, estimated in 1866 that they could not agree, but in October 1868 the construction of a new church was begun in Assentoft. It was the first church that Frits Uldall designed, and November 28, 1869 the new Essenbæk Church was consecrated by Bishop Brammer. Its bell was recast in 1885.

After the ”church owner” requested to be exempt from liability for the church's condition, the church in 1913 became self-governing.

Architecture 

The church is built in round-arch style of red large medieval brick, on a base of granite ashlars from the Old Essenbæk Church. It consists of a nave and chancel in one, internally separated by a round arched triumphal wall, and an apse towards east, and towards west a 26.4 meters high steeple, including an octagonal spire, the sub-room of which it used as church porch. The church's rafter ceiling is covered with lead.

In the church the pulpit, the pews, the framings of the altarpiece, and the foliage in the rafter ceiling were in Romanesque style when the church was consecrated. The altarpiece was a painting by A. Dorph representing Christ and the Pharisees.

Furniture 

As altarpiece there stands a rose of copper.

The altar candlesticks are from ca. 1600.

The baptismal font from the Early Middle Ages is of granite in Romanesque style, with reliefs of heads on stakes, an Agnus Dei, a bird and two lions on the basin. It was used as birdbath in the garden by Gammel Estrup, until in 1869 it was moved to the church. It is probably identical to the baptismal font that in 1830 stood in the Old Essenbæk Church.

On an organ loft in the church's western end stands an organ in four voices.

Restorations

1967-1968 
Mogens Henri Jørgensen paints the ceiling of the nave, the pulpit and the pews.

1985 
Glass mosaics by Mogens Henri Jørgensen are installed in the nave.

1986 

There are installed more works by Mogens Henri Jørgensen - a glass mosaic in the chancel, a stained glass in the apse, and the altarpiece rose

1993 
A glass mosaic window by Mogens Henri Jørgensen is installed.

Surroundings 
On ca. three barrels of land  around the church was landscaped a churchyard, which was surrounded by a wall of shaped stones towards south and west, a stone dike towards north and east, and planted with coniferous trees along the rest of its northern rim. After the newly buried coffins from the old churchyard which could stand it were moved there the night before, the new churchyard was consecrated November 28, 1872 by Bishop Brammer and the parish's priest Alfred Hjalmar Elmqvist.

A mortuary was built on the churchyard in 1930.

Monuments 

In the northern wall of the church porch is installed a large tombstone with portrait reliefs in half-figure of Anne Nielsdatter, and her husbands Rasmus Pedersen and Bertel Henningsen. The first of the men was Essenbæk and Kristrup's judicial district bailiff until his death in 1602, and was succeeded as such by the second man. The ca. two meters long and ca. one and a half meter high sandstone plaque perhaps lay in the floor of the Old Essenbæk Church.

Priests

References 

Churches in the Central Denmark Region
Buildings and structures in Randers Municipality
Churches in the Diocese of Aarhus